Air Bucharest is an charter airline with its head office in Sector 1, Bucharest, Romania. The airline operates charter flights to various destinations in Europe, Africa, and the Middle East out of Henri Coandă International Airport, Iași International Airport, Cluj-Napoca International Airport, Traian Vuia International Airport, Sibiu International Airport, and Bacău International Airport.

History
The airline was founded in 2010, with the first commercial flight departing from Cluj and arriving in Antalya on 3 July.

Destinations

Fleet

The Air Bucharest fleet comprised the following aircraft (as of February 2021):

The airline fleet previously included the following aircraft:

 1 Boeing 737-400

References

External links

 

Airlines of Romania
Airlines established in 2010
Charter airlines
Romanian companies established in 2010
Companies based in Bucharest